Justin Dwayne Lee Johnson (born January 16, 1980), best known by the stage name Alyssa Edwards, is an American drag performer, choreographer, and businessperson. Edwards was known for competing in drag pageantry (notably Miss Gay America 2010) before rising to international attention as a contestant on the fifth season of RuPaul's Drag Race, becoming a fan favorite during and after her time on the show. Edwards subsequently appeared on the second season of RuPaul's Drag Race All Stars and starred in her own web series, Alyssa's Secret. 

Johnson lives in Mesquite, Texas, where he owns and operates a dance studio, Beyond Belief Dance Company. Johnson and his dance studio are the centerpieces of a docuseries, Dancing Queen, produced by RuPaul and World of Wonder that premiered on October 5, 2018 on Netflix.

Career
Johnson performs under the stage name Alyssa Edwards. She chose her name in homage to Alyssa Milano and to her drag mother Laken Edwards, a former drag queen. Edwards is part of the drag family "the Haus of Edwards," and serves as drag mother to fellow RuPaul's Drag Race contestants Shangela Laquifa Wadley, Laganja Estranja, Gia Gunn, Vivienne Pinay, and Plastique Tiara. Edwards was one of the judges of the 2010 California Entertainer of the Year pageant, where Shangela won.

Edwards appeared in the 2008 documentary Pageant. The film focused on the 34th Miss Gay America pageant of 2006. On December 9, 2010, Edwards was stripped of her 2010 Miss Gay America title for having business dealings in conflict with obligations to the Miss Gay America organization. First alternate Coco Montrese replaced Edwards as the winner of Miss Gay America. That same year, Edwards was also stripped of her title as All American Goddess.

In November 2012, Logo announced that Edwards was among 14 drag queens who would be competing on the fifth season of RuPaul's Drag Race. Also performing on the show was pageant friend and rival Coco Montrese.

Edwards performed and won in the ballet-themed main challenge in the "Black Swan: Why It Gotta Be Black?" episode of Rupaul's Drag Race. As part of the show, Edwards sang on the "We Are the World"-inspired song "Can I Get an Amen?" The song's proceeds helped benefit the Los Angeles Gay and Lesbian Center.  Edwards was eliminated in episode nine, following a lip sync against Coco Montrese, and finished in sixth place. Edwards has also been a special guest on the podcast series run by RuPaul and Michelle Visage called RuPaul: What's The Tee?

She was one of thirty drag queens featured in Miley Cyrus's 2015 VMA performance.

Edwards is also known for her web series titled "Alyssa's Secret". The series stars Alyssa Edwards speaking on a multitude of subjects and often features guests including other members of the Haus of Edwards. The webseries is produced and premieres through World of Wonder Productions.

In 2016, Edwards returned as one of 10 contestants in Season 2 of RuPaul's Drag Race: All Stars, ending in fifth place. Edwards won the main challenge of the third episode titled "Herstory of the World", playing Annie Oakley in a performance featuring other famous women throughout history. She was then eliminated in episode four "Drag Movie Shequels", after playing Bland in "Wha' Ha' Happened to Baby JJ", a parody of "What Ever Happened to Baby Jane?", with Alaska as Baby JJ.

Edwards returned in episode five "Revenge of the Queens" by winning a chance to reenter the competition, winning a comedy challenge with Alaska followed by a lip sync of Rihanna's "Shut Up and Drive", in which both Edwards and Tatianna won. Edwards was then controversially eliminated a second time by Detox in episode seven "A Family that Drags Together", coming in fifth place overall.

In 2019, Edwards released a makeup palette in collaboration with Anastasia Beverly Hills.

In Episode 2 of All Stars 5, Alyssa made a guest appearance as a "Lip Sync Assassin", where she lip-synced against Shea Couleé, but lost.

Edwards was shortlisted for the fourth season of RuPaul's Drag Race but was cast as an alternate and instead was on the fifth season of RuPaul's Drag Race.

Edwards appeared on the tenth season of RuPaul's Drag Race as a choreographer for PharmaRusical and on the seventh episode of the eleventh season of RuPaul's Drag Race as a runway coach. In June 2019, a panel of judges from New York magazine placed her fifth on their list of "the most powerful drag queens in America", a ranking of 100 former RuPaul's Drag Race contestants.

In 2021 Edwards appeared on the 16th season of America's Got Talent, accompanying members of Beyond Belief as they auditioned for a spot in the competition.

In June 2021 Edwards had a one-woman show on London's West End entitled Alyssa: Memoirs of a Queen. The autobiographical show ran for eight performances, featuring tales from her childhood to "reality TV apotheosis".

Titles
Edwards competed in and won numerous pageant titles. They include:
 Miss Gay Texas America 2004, first alternate
 Miss Gay Texas America 2005, winner
 Miss Gay America 2005, second alternate
 Miss Northwest Regional Representative 2005, winner
 Miss Gay America 2006, third alternate
 Miss Texas FFI 2006, winner
 Miss Gay USofA 2006, winner
 Miss Texas Continental 2007, winner
 Miss Shining Star Continental 2009, winner
 Miss Gay Mid East America 2008, first alternate
 Miss Gay America 2009, third alternate
 Miss Gay Heartland America 2009, first alternate 
 Miss Gay Heartland America 2010, first alternate
 Miss Gay America 2010, winner
 Southern Elegance All American Goddess 2010, winner
 All American Goddess 2010, winner
 National Entertainer of the Year, FI 2014, first alternate

RuPaul's Drag Race

Season 5

In 2012, It was announced that Edwards had been cast on the fifth season of RuPaul's Drag Race. Where she was cast alongside Coco Montrese, who she had fallen out with over Edwards being unable to complete her run as Miss Gay America 2010 and being replaced by Montrese. The two's history lead to many arguments and dramatic moments throughout the season. A ballet challenge win in the fourth episode gave Edwards immunity, saving her from being in the bottom two in the following episode after a negatively received Katy Perry snatch game performance, but RuPaul still asked Edwards to apologize to Perry on Twitter due to the performance. In episode 7, after Edwards performed weakly in a stand-up roast challenge she was placed in the bottom two alongside Roxxxy Andrews, where both would be allowed to stay in the competition after a strong lip-sync to Whip My Hair by Willow Smith. Edwards would fall in the bottom two for a second time in the following episode where she would send home Ivy Winters in a lip sync to Gwen Guthrie's Ain't Nothin' Goin' On but the Rent. Alyssa's time on the season would come to a finish in episode 9, where another poor challenge performance lead to a close lip sync to Paula Abdul's Cold Hearted against rival Coco Montrese, where Montrese emerged victorious and Edwards was eliminated in sixth place.

All Stars 2

Due to positive fan reception, in 2016 it was announced that Alyssa Edwards had been cast on the second season of RuPaul's Drag Race All Stars. The cast included four other queens from season 5, including her season 5 nemesis, Coco Montrese. However, upon Montrese's entrance, it is revealed that the pair had since forgiven each other. A solid performance in the episode 1 talent show meant that Edwards was safe, yet her former enemy was less lucky as Roxxxy Andrews eliminated Montrese first. In episode 3, Edwards's strong performance as Annie Oakley in a "rusical" challenge placed her in the top 2 for her first time in the season against Detox, where Edwards would win the lip sync to Taylor Dayne's Tell It to My Heart  and chose to eliminate Ginger Minj over Katya. In the following episode, Edwards was eliminated by Alaska over Roxxxy Andrews and Katya.

In episode 5, eliminated queens were given a chance to re-enter the competition by pairing up with a queen who was still in the game. Edwards was paired with Alaska, and the pair were in the top 2 alongside Detox and the previously eliminated Tatianna. In a lip sync to Rihanna's Shut Up and Drive, both queens were allowed to re-enter the competition and eliminate one of the bottom two. Both chose to eliminate Phi Phi O'Hara. In the seventh episode, Edwards was controversially eliminated by Detox over Andrews and Alaska on the anniversary of her mother's death and one episode before the finale, a move which many saw as unfair as Detox, Alaska, and Andrews had a strong friendship and many thought that Edwards had not deserved to be in the bottom for the episode. Edwards finished in fifth place on All Stars 2.

Filmography

Film

Television

Music videos

Web series

Awards and nominations

References

External links 

 
 

Living people
21st-century American businesspeople
21st-century American businesswomen
American drag queens
Beauty pageant controversies
People from Mesquite, Texas
LGBT dancers
LGBT choreographers
LGBT people from Texas
Businesspeople from Dallas
Alyssa Edwards
Alyssa Edwards
1980 births